The Complete Cosmicomics is a 2009 book that collects almost all<ref>"Almost all" according to The Village Voice (see References); however, the introduction by McLaughlin claims that the book contains all the Cosmicomics.</ref> of the Cosmicomic stories by Italian postmodern writer Italo Calvino.

The single volume collection includes the following:

 The 12 stories that comprise Cosmicomics The 11 stories that comprise t zero (also published as Time and the Hunter)
 4 stories from Numbers in the Dark and Other Stories 
 7 stories newly translated by Martin McLaughlin (available for the first time in English)

Translator Martin McLaughlin explains the origins of the seven new stories in his introduction to The Complete Cosmicomics'':

References 
 Esposito, Scott. The Complete Cosmicomics: Full Contents and Details. The Quarterly Conversation, 2009.
 Phillips, Julie. The Complete Cosmicomics, a Holy Grail for Italo Calvino Fans. The Village Voice, July 20, 2009.

Notes 

Short story collections by Italo Calvino
2009 short story collections
Science fiction short story collections